Metropolitanos Fútbol Club is a Venezuelan professional football club based in Caracas. Founded in 2012, they play in the Venezuelan Primera División, holding home matches at the Estadio Olímpico de la UCV.

History
Founded on 3 August 2012 under the name of Deportivo Metropolitano, the club took Lara FC's place in the Segunda División for the 2012–13 season, as the latter had severe financial problems. After Lara's dissolution, Unión Lara SC was refounded and started to play in the Tercera División.

After finishing fourth and missing out promotion, Metropolitanos achieved promotion to the Primera División at the end of the 2013–14 campaign, after finishing in the second position. After suffering relegation in 2015, the club immediately returned to the top tier after winning the second division in 2016.

After narrowly avoiding relegation in 2017, Metropolitanos finished in the penultimate position overall in 2018, but benefitted from the league's expansion to remain in the first division. After the arrival of José María Morr as manager, the club qualified to the Copa Sudamericana in 2020 and 2021, aside from winning a first-ever title in 2022.

Honours
Venezuelan Primera División: 1
2022
Venezuelan Segunda División: 1
2016

Managers
 Rafael Santana (2012–14)
 Hugo Savarese (2014–15)
 Rafael Santana (2016–17)
 Daniel de Oliveira (2018)
 Manuel di Maio (interim; 2018)
 Jhon Giraldo (2018)
 José María Morr (2019–)

References

External links
Official Site

Association football clubs established in 2012
Metropolitanos FC
Football clubs in Caracas
2012 establishments in Venezuela